is a  district in Kyoto, Japan, known for its geisha and , and is home to many of the city's  and traditional tea houses. Like Gion, Ponto-chō is famous for the preservation of forms of traditional architecture and entertainment.

Etymology
The name "Ponto-chō" is said to be a portmanteau of the Portuguese word  (bridge) and the Japanese word , meaning town, block or street.

District
Ponto-chō as a district is for the most part constructed around a long, narrow alleyway, running from Shijō-dōri to Sanjō-dōri, one block west of the Kamo River. This location is also known as the traditional location for the beginning of kabuki as an art form, and a statue of kabuki's founder, Izumo no Okuni, stands on the opposite side of the river.

Cultural features
Geisha (known locally as ) and  have existed in Ponto-chō since at least the 16th century, as have prostitution and other forms of entertainment. Today, the area, lit by traditional lanterns at night, contains a mix of exclusive restaurants — often featuring outdoor riverside dining on wooden patios — geisha houses and tea houses, brothels, bars, and cheap eateries.

The area is also home to the Ponto-chō Kaburenjō Theatre at the Sanjō-dōri end of the street.

In the 1970s, American anthropologist Liza Dalby visited Kyoto for a year as part of her doctoral studies into the institution of geisha in modern Japanese society, eventually unofficially becoming a geisha as part of her research. Dalby later wrote a well-received book, Geisha, about the experience.

See also
Gion
Kamishichiken
Miyagawacho
Shimabara

References

External links

Ponto-cho Noren-kai
Kamogawa Odori (Pontochō Kaburenjō Theater)
 (Pontochō Kaburenjō Theater)

Geography of Kyoto